Charlestown is a suburb of Weymouth in Dorset, England, situated in the west of the town beside The Fleet, although it is in Chickerell parish (population 5,282 in 2001).

References

External links

Geography of Weymouth, Dorset